Han Myeong-mok (born February 1, 1991) is a South Korean male weightlifter, competing in the 62 kg category and representing South Korea at international competitions. He participated  in the men's 62 kg event at the 2015 World Weightlifting Championships, and at the 2016 Summer Olympics, finishing in ninth position.

He competed in the men's 67 kg event at the 2020 Summer Olympics in Tokyo, Japan.

Major results

References

External links
 

1991 births
Living people
South Korean male weightlifters
Place of birth missing (living people)
Weightlifters at the 2016 Summer Olympics
Olympic weightlifters of South Korea
Weightlifters at the 2014 Asian Games
Asian Games competitors for South Korea
Weightlifters at the 2020 Summer Olympics
20th-century South Korean people
21st-century South Korean people